The North Dakota Open is the North Dakota state open golf tournament, open to both amateur and professional golfers.

History 
The inaugural event was in 1964. The event was one-round long and had a purse of $2,000. Eddie Langert of St. Paul, Minnesota shot a par-72 to win the tournament by three strokes over Corky Dahl, Herb Marcussen, and Paul O'Leary. The following year the tournament increased to two rounds long. In addition, prize money increased to $3,500 and the winner's cheque was now $600. George Shortridge shot an opening round 73 (+1) to take a one-stroke lead. He led by one over Langert and Byron Comstock. A further shot behind were a number of players including Corky Dahl and Fargo's "host pro" Jack Webb. Langert and Webb outplayed all competitors during the final round and were "deadlocked" down the stretch. However, Webb holed a 40-yard approach shot for a birdie at the par-4 18th hole to assure the win. His 70 (−2) was the only under-par round of the tournament. At 145 (+1), Webb defeated Langert by two strokes.

In 1968, the total prize money increased to $10,000. In 1969, at least 42 professionals entered the event, the most ever. As of 1970, the event remained at Fargo Country Club. Before the 1970 tournament it was announced that, "Most of the leading pros in the Dakotas, Minnesota and Canada have indicated they will enter," including Mike Morley, PGA Tour professional. In 1972, Bill Schwenneker, former assistant professional at Fargo Country Club, won the event. In 1973, the winner's prize increased to $1,600. Morley, the PGA Tour pro, won the event. In 1974, Dave Comstock broke Fargo Country Club's course record during the tournament. He shot an opening round 65 breaking Mike Morley's course record. In the early summer of 1975 there were extensive floods in the Fargo region. The tournament, which was scheduled to be played in September, was cancelled by July 18. In mid-1970s, the tournament started to alternate between Fargo Country Club and Oxbow Country Club with the final round at Fargo CC. By the late 1970s, the tournament alternated between Fargo CC and Moorhead Country Club.

In 1980, there was a significant increase in prize money making it the "richest" North Dakota Open ever. The overall purse expanded from $32,000 to $40,000 and the winner's cheque increased from $4,000 to $5,000. In 1981, the winner's prize money had increased to $6,000. In 1984, the tournament started to be sponsored by the Melroe Division Clark Equipment Company. In 1985, Skip Holten broke the tournament record with a 203 total.

Winners 

Source:

(a) denotes amateur
1 Morley's birdie on first sudden-death playoff hole defeated Dan Halldorson
2 Sullivan won on the first hole of a sudden-death playoff

References 

Golf in North Dakota
State Open golf tournaments